Mirabella albicaulis, synonym Cereus albicaulis, is a species of flowering plant in the family Cactaceae, native to Northeast and Southeast Brazil. It was first described by Britton and Rose in 1920 as Acanthocereus albicaulis.

References

Cactoideae
Flora of Northeast Brazil
Flora of Southeast Brazil
Plants described in 1920
Taxa named by Nathaniel Lord Britton
Taxa named by Joseph Nelson Rose